Billy Batson and the Magic of Shazam! was an all-ages comic book series published by DC Comics as a part of its Johnny DC imprint. The series debuted in September 2008, and was originally written and drawn by Mike Kunkel.

Overview
In style and tone, Billy Batson and the Magic of Shazam! is a follow-up to Jeff Smith's 2007 miniseries Shazam!: The Monster Society of Evil, as both draw upon the light, whimsical feel of the Captain Marvel comics of the Golden Age for inspiration. In Magic of Shazam!, Billy Batson is a young boy who must juggle his superheroic life as Captain Marvel with looking after his rambunctious little sister Mary Marvel. Unlike Billy, who transforms into an adult when he speaks the magic word "Shazam", Mary possesses only a fraction of his power, although she is faster, and remains a child in her superhero form. Tawky Tawny, a shapeshifting servant of the wizard Shazam, assists them and comes to live with them at their insistence when his form is later fixed as a humanoid tiger. Other Marvel Family characters are similarly re-imagined, such as Black Adam who is presented as bratty exchange student Theo Adam, a classmate of Billy. In their clashes, a boy, Freddy Freeman, is accidentally seriously injured and paralysed and blamed the Marvels for it.  Black Adam exploited that hate to recruit him with his power as Black Adam Jr. until the boy realizes the villain's evil and reconciled with the Marvels, which led to Captain Marvel bestowing him a portion of his power to become Captain Marvel Jr.

Collected editions
 Billy Batson and the Magic of Shazam! (collects #1–6)
 Billy Batson and the Magic of Shazam!: Mr. Mind Over Matter (collects #7–12)

Notes

References

External links
Official blog for Billy Batson and the Magic of Shazam! by Mike Kunkel

Reviews

Billy Batson and the Magic of Shazam! #1 review, Comic Book Resources
Billy Batson and the Magic of Shazam! #1 review, IGN
Billy Batson and the Magic of Shazam! #1 review, Newsarama

2008 comics debuts
Captain Marvel (DC Comics)